The greater Saint Croix skink (Spondylurus magnacruzae) is a species of skink found on Saint Croix in the United States Virgin Islands.

It was formerly present across most of Saint Croix where it was sighted with some regularity, but was largely extirpated from the island by the late 19th century due to the introduced small Indian mongoose (Urva auropunctata). From then onwards, the species was only known from the satellite island of Green Cay, where it is known from a specimen collected in 1964. Further surveys detected only two other sightings: once in 1987 (this individual was photographed, and this remains the only known photograph of a live S. magnacruzae) and once in September 2000. No further sightings have been recorded since then. Green Cay is a small island and also supports black rats (Rattus rattus), which may threaten any surviving populations of the species.

References

Spondylurus
Reptiles described in 2012
Reptiles of the Caribbean
Endemic fauna of the Caribbean
Taxa named by Stephen Blair Hedges
Taxa named by Caitlin E. Conn